The Polynesia Cup 2000 was the third Polynesia-wide football tournament ever held. It took place in Tahiti and five teams participated: Tahiti, Samoa, American Samoa, Tonga and Cook Islands and server for the third time as Oceania Nations Cup qualifyer.

The teams played each other according to a round-robin format with Tahiti winning the tournament for the third time and qualifying to the Oceania Nations Cup 2000 along with Cook Islands.

Results

Tahiti and  Cook Islands qualified for Oceania Nations Cup 2000

References 

Polynesia Cup
1999–2000 in OFC football
2000 OFC Nations Cup
2000
Beach